The CHL Humanitarian of the Year Award is given out annually to the Canadian Hockey League player judged to have made the most notable contribution to his community in a humanitarian sense. It is chosen from the winners of the QMJHL Humanitarian of the Year, the Dan Snyder Memorial Trophy (OHL), or the Doug Wickenheiser Memorial Trophy (WHL).

Winners
List of winners of the CHL Humanitarian of the Year Award.

See also
 List of Canadian Hockey League awards

References

External links
 CHL Awards – CHL

Canadian Hockey League trophies and awards
Humanitarian and service awards